The Federación Ecuatoguineana de Atletismo (FEA; Athletics Federation of Equatorial Guinea) is the governing body for the sport of athletics in Equatorial Guinea.  Current president is Manuel Sabino Asumu Cawan.

History 
FEA was founded in 1979, and was affiliated to the IAAF in the year 1986.

Affiliations 
International Association of Athletics Federations (IAAF)
Confederation of African Athletics (CAA)
Asociación Iberoamericana de Atletismo (AIA; Ibero-American Athletics Association)
Moreover, it is part of the following national organisations:
Olympic Committee of Equatorial Guinea (COGE; Spanish: Comité Olímpico de Guinea Ecuatorial)

National records 
FEA maintains the national records.

References 

Equatorial Guinea
Equatorial Guinea at multi-sport events
National governing bodies for athletics
Sports organizations established in 1979